Lozekia is a genus of land snails in the family Hygromiidae, the hairy snails and their allies.

Species
Species include:
 Lozekia deubeli
 Lozekia transsilvanica

References

Further reading
Fehér, Z., et al. (2009). Phylogeny and phylogeography of the Lozekia–Kovacsia species group (Gastropoda: Hygromiidae). Journal of Zoological Systematics and Evolutionary Research 47(4) 306–14.

Hygromiidae
Gastropod genera